Brain Pain is the seventh studio album by Massachusetts pop punk band Four Year Strong, released on February 28, 2020. It was the band's first studio album in nearly five years. The album was announced on January 14, 2020, accompanied by the release of the first two singles from the album, "Talking Myself in Circles" and "Brain Pain".

Background and recording
Vocalist/guitarist Alan Day spent time producing records for Can't Swim, Seaway and Knuckle Puck, and managing his Christmas tree farm. In January and February 2017, the group went on a UK tour to celebrate the 10th anniversary of Rise or Die Trying (2007). It was followed by two US legs: one in March and April 2017, and the other in September and October. A compilation album, Some of You Will Like This, Some of You Won't, appeared in September 2017.

Recording sessions for the band's next album were held at Graphic Nature Audio in Belleville, New Jersey with producer Will Putney. He also acted as engineer, with additional engineering from Steve Seid and additional editing from Geo Hewitt. Randy Slaugh and Guy Randle engineered the strings on "Be Good When I'm Gone". Putney mixed and mastered the recordings; the bonus tracks from the reissue were produced by the band and engineered, mixed and mastered by Day.

Release
On January 14, 2020, Brain Pain was announced for release the following month. Alongside this, the album's artwork and track listing were revealed. In addition, "Talking Myself in Circles" and the title-track were made available for streaming. On February 11, a music video was released for "Learn to Love the Lie", directed by Miguel Barbosa. On February 27, a music video was released for "Get Out of My Head", directed by Barbosa and the band.  The following day, Brain Pain was released through Pure Noise Records. Following this, the group supported Silverstein on their 20th anniversary tour. The trek was planned to continue into April, however, in mid-March the second half of shows were pushed back to July and August due to the COVID-19 pandemic.

Track listing
Track listing per booklet.

Personnel
Personnel per reissue booklet.

Four Year Strong
 Alan Day – vocals, guitars
 Dan O'Connor – vocals, guitars
 Jake Massucco – drums
 Joe Weiss – bass guitar

Additional musicians
 Emily Huntington – violin (track 9)
 Emily Rust – violin (track 9)
 Caryn Bradley – viola (track 9)
 Lisa Jackson – cello (track 9)

Production and design
 Will Putney – producer, engineer, mixing, mastering
 Steve Seid – additional engineering
 Geo Hewitt – additional editing
 Randy Slaugh – string arrangement engineer (track 9)
 Guy Randle – string engineer (track 9)
 Four Year Strong – producer (bonus tracks)
 Alan Day – engineer, mixing, mastering (bonus tracks)
 Don Phury – illustration
 Donny Phillips – art direction, design

Charts

See also
List of 2020 albums

References

2020 albums
Four Year Strong albums
Pure Noise Records albums
Albums produced by Will Putney